Tim Stoner (born 1970 in Essex) is an English painter. Growing up in London, he attended Leyton Sixth Form College. He trained at the Norwich School of Art & Design 1989–92, the Royal College of Art, London (where in 1994 he graduated with an MA in Painting), and the Rijksakademie Van Beeldende Kunsten (Royal Academy of Visual Arts) in Amsterdam 1997–98. He won the Beck's Futures art award in 2001, and worked at the British School at Rome during the same year.

References

External links
Tim Stoner Website
Vardaxoglou Gallery, London

People from Essex
English artists
Alumni of the Royal College of Art
Alumni of Norwich University of the Arts
Living people
1970 births